This was the first edition of the tournament.

Isak Arvidsson and Fred Simonsson won the title after defeating Johan Brunström and Andreas Siljeström 6–3, 7–5 in the final.

Seeds

Draw

References
 Main Draw

Bastad Challenger - Doubles
2016 Doubles
Bast